Tomoki Suzuki may refer to:

 Tomoki Suzuki (athlete) (1994), Japanese wheelchair racer
 Tomoki Suzuki (footballer) (1985), Japanese former professional footballer